Fred James Cassibry (September 26, 1918 – July 6, 1996) was a United States district judge of the United States District Court for the Eastern District of Louisiana.

Education and career

Born in D'Lo, Mississippi, Cassibry received a Bachelor of Arts degree from Tulane University in 1941 and a Bachelor of Laws from Tulane University Law School in 1943. He was in the United States Navy during World War II, from 1944 to 1946. He was then a field examiner for the National Labor Relations Board from 1946 to 1948. He entered private practice in New Orleans, Louisiana from 1948 to 1961, and was a New Orleans City Councilman from 1954 to 1961. He was a judge of the Civil District Court of the Parish of Orleans from 1961 to 1966.

Federal judicial service

On October 11, 1966, Cassibry was nominated by President Lyndon B. Johnson to a new seat on the United States District Court for the Eastern District of Louisiana created by 80 Stat. 75. He was confirmed by the United States Senate on October 20, 1966, and received his commission on November 3, 1966. He assumed senior status on March 15, 1984, serving in that capacity until his retirement on April 3, 1987.

Death

Cassibry died on July 6, 1996, in New Orleans.

Honor

In 1999, the square surrounding the Supreme Court of Louisiana was named "Judge Fred J. Cassibry Square" in Cassibry's honor.

References

Sources
 

1918 births
1996 deaths
People from Simpson County, Mississippi
Louisiana state court judges
New Orleans City Council members
Judges of the United States District Court for the Eastern District of Louisiana
United States district court judges appointed by Lyndon B. Johnson
20th-century American judges
Tulane University alumni
Tulane University Law School alumni
United States Navy personnel of World War II
20th-century American lawyers